The North Calder Water is a river in North Lanarkshire, Scotland. For the last  of its course, it forms part of the boundary between North Lanarkshire (near to Birkenshaw) and Glasgow (near to Broomhouse). The name Calder is thought to be Brythonic and to mean 'hard cold flowing' water.

In addition to Caldercruix and Calderbank settlements, the river is referenced in man-made features near its course, including Caldervale High School in Airdrie, Calderbraes Golf Club near Birkenshaw, Calderview Community Centre in Coatbridge, and the former Calderbank House and Calderpark Zoo at Broomhouse.

See also
South Calder Water, also flows through North Lanarkshire to the Clyde from near Shotts to Strathclyde Park 
Rotten Calder, flows through South Lanarkshire from near Eaglesham to Newton, its mouth on the south bank almost opposite that of the North Calder

References

Rivers of Falkirk (council area)
Rivers of North Lanarkshire
Rivers of Glasgow
River Clyde
Baillieston